The 2020–21 Málaga CF season was the club's 73rd season in existence and its third consecutive season in the second division of Spanish football. In addition to the domestic league, Málaga participated in this season's edition of the Copa del Rey. The season covered the period from 20 July 2020 to 30 June 2021.

Players

First-team squad

Reserve team

Out on loan

Transfers

In

Out

Pre-season and friendlies

Competitions

Overview

Segunda División

League table

Results summary

Results by round

Matches
The league fixtures were announced on 31 August 2020.

Copa del Rey

Statistics

Appearances and goals
Last updated on 30 May 2021

|-
! colspan=10 style=background:#dcdcdc; text-align:center|Goalkeepers

|-
! colspan=10 style=background:#dcdcdc; text-align:center|Defenders

|-
! colspan=14 style=background:#dcdcdc; text-align:center|Midfielders

|-
! colspan=14 style=background:#dcdcdc; text-align:center|Forwards

|-
! colspan=14 style=background:#dcdcdc; text-align:center| Players who have made an appearance or had a squad number this season but have left the club

|}

Goalscorers

Notes

References

External links

Málaga CF seasons
Málaga CF